This list includes the names Becky, Becca and Rebecca Edwards.

Becky Edwards may refer to:
 Becky Edwards (politician) (living), American politician
 Becky Edwards (soccer) (born 1988), American soccer player
 Rebecca Edwards (rower), 2020 British Olympian

Becca Edwards may refer to:
 Becca Edwards (living), Ex on the Beach participant